The 2003 Copa de S.M. la Reina de Fútbol was the 21st edition of Spain's women's football national cup, and took place from 18 May to 29 June 2003.

CE Sabadell, which was celebrating its centennial and was entrusted the final's hosting, became the 11th Copa de la Reina champion by defeating CD Híspalis, Levante UD (which had won the previous three editions) and finally CFF Estudiantes. Superliga champion Athletic Club was defeated by Estudiantes in the first round.

Results

First round

Quarter-finals

Semifinals

|}

Final

References

Copa de la Reina
Women
2002-03